Bequest to the Nation is a 1973 British historical drama film directed by James Cellan Jones and starring Glenda Jackson, Peter Finch, Michael Jayston and Margaret Leighton. It is based on the 1970 Terence Rattigan play A Bequest to the Nation. In the United States, it was released as The Nelson Affair.

Plot summary
The film depicts the relationship between Admiral Lord Nelson and his mistress, Lady Hamilton, during the Napoleonic Wars plus others they would meet, including Nelson's nephew, George Matcham Jr.

Much of the story takes place at Merton Place, Nelson & Hamilton's estate, before Nelson's heading out to sea for the 1805 Battle of Trafalgar.

Cast

Critical reception
The New York Times found the film "thoroughly genteel", and wrote that Rattigan's dialogue was written "in the manner of someone regurgitating the cadences of a 19th-century schoolgirl's diary... Peter Finch plays Lord Nelson with a reserved passion that seems intelligently thought out but is not terribly interesting to watch, while Glenda Jackson seems to go at Lady Hamilton from the opposite direction." Sky Cinema found the film "remarkable for the handsome Technicolor photography of Gerry Fisher and the brilliant production design of Carmen Dillon. There are some touching moments, notably those involving Margaret Leighton as Lady Nelson, and vivid climactic battle scenes. However, the two principals are not very well cast, and while Peter Finch struggles gamely to erase memories of Olivier's version of the role, Miss Jackson responds by stridently over-playing her hand as a sluttish Emma"; and Time Out wrote, "Histrionics apart, you come out wondering whether it really matters."

Locations
Lansdown Crescent, Bath

References

External links
 

1973 films
1970s historical drama films
Films based on works by Terence Rattigan
British historical drama films
Films with screenplays by Terence Rattigan
Films scored by Michel Legrand
Films produced by Hal B. Wallis
Films set in the 1790s
Films set in the 1800s
Universal Pictures films
Cultural depictions of Horatio Nelson
Cultural depictions of Emma, Lady Hamilton
1973 drama films
Films directed by James Cellan Jones
1970s English-language films
1970s British films